Wittighausen is a municipality in the district of Main-Tauber in northeast Baden-Württemberg, Germany. It consists of the villages of Oberwittighausen, Poppenhausen, Unterwittighausen, and Vilchband.

Geographical information
Wittighausen is situated in the quadrangle between the cities of Würzburg, Ochsenfurt, Bad Mergentheim and Tauberbischofsheim  on the banks of the brook Wittigbach which joins into the Grünbach in near Grünsfeld.

Politics

Mayor
 1987-2002 Werner Hoos
 2002-2014 Bernhard Henneberger
 2014 Marcus Wessels

References

External links
 Official website

Main-Tauber-Kreis